Three Kings refers to the Biblical Magi, also known as the Three Wise Men, appearing in the Gospel of Matthew.

Three Kings may also refer to:

Film and television
 The Three Kings (film), a 1929 silent British-German drama film
 The Three Kings (1987 film), a made-for-television film by Mel Damski
 Three Kings (1999 film), an American war film set in post–Gulf War Iraq
 Les Rois mages, a 2001 French film dubbed The Three Kings in English
 Los Reyes Magos (film), a 2003 animated Spanish film
 Three Kings (YuYu Hakusho), the three rulers of the demon plane of Makai in the manga and anime series YuYu Hakusho
 "Three Kings" (Family Guy), a 2009 episode of Family Guy
 Three Kings (2011 film), a Malayalam comedy film
 Three Kings (TV series), a Czech TV series about the resistance organization "Obrana národa" also known as Three Kings

Literature
 3 Kings (book), a 2018 book about hip-hop by Zack O'Malley Greenburg.
 Three Kings, a book of three short stories by Chinese writer Ah Cheng
 The Three Kings (novel), a 2010 novel by Alisa Valdes
 1 Kings, which is known as 3 Kings in some Bible versions. In those versions, 1 and 2 Kings really refer to 1 and 2 Samuel, while 3 and 4 Kings refer to the modern 1 and 2 Kings.
 Fu Lu Shou, personified deities of good fortune, prosperity, and longevity in Chinese Buddhism and Taoism

Music
 Three Kings of Blues: Albert King, Freddie King, and B.B. King
 3 Kings (jazz trio)
 "3 Kings" (song), a 2005 song by Slim Thug, T.I. and Bun B
 "3 Kings" (Rick Ross song), a 2012 song by Rick Ross, Jay-Z and Dr. Dre
 "The Three Kings (Cornelius)", a Christmas/Epiphany song by Peter Cornelius
 "The Three Kings" (Dove), a carol by Jonathan Dove
 Three Kings (TGT album), 2013
 We Three Kings, a Christmas carol
 Three Kings (Dead Meadow album)

Places
 Three Kings, New Zealand is a suburb of Auckland, New Zealand
 A common name for Te Tatua-a-Riukiuta, a volcano in Auckland, New Zealand
 Three Kings Islands, islands located off the coast of the Northland Region, New Zealand
 Three Wise Men (volcanoes), a series of three small seamounts in the Pacific Ocean

History
 Three Sovereigns and Five Emperors, a group of mythological rulers from ancient China during circa 2852 BC to 2070 BC.
 Era of Three Kings, an era in the history of Estonia from 1561 to 1625/1629 when Estonia was divided between Sweden, Poland–Lithuania and Denmark.
 Battle of the Three Kings, also known as the Battle of Alcazarquivir, a decisive 1578 Moroccan victory over Portugal
 Three Kings (Czech anti-Nazi resistance) (Tři králové in Czech), Czech anti-Nazi group of World War II

Astronomy
 Orion's Belt, an asterism composed of three stars of the Orion constellation

Sports
 A collective nickname given to NBA basketball players LeBron James, Chris Bosh, and Dwyane Wade of the Miami Heat by their play-by-play announcer Eric Reid after they were all officially introduced as teammates on July 9, 2010

See also
We Three Kings (disambiguation)